Jill Marie Landis (born November 8, 1948, in Clinton, Indiana, United States) is an  American author of historical and contemporary romance novels.

Biography
Jill Marie Landis was born on November 8, 1948, in Indiana, but moved to California when she was only ten years old. While studying for her B.A. in history from Long Beach State University, Landis held summer jobs working as a ride operator for Fantasyland at Disneyland.

Upon graduation, she spent ten years as a kindergarten teacher and then three years teaching English as a Second Language part-time. Although Landis wrote her first romance novel in junior high, she did not decide to pursue a writing career until 1983. Three years after she committed to writing a full-length novel, Landis sold a manuscript. From 1988 through 2003, she published sixteen historical romance novels. In July 2003, she made her debut in the contemporary romance genre. In 2008, her first inspirational historical romance, Homecoming, was published by Steeple Hill. It was followed in 2009 by The Accidental Lawman. Writing for Zondervan, Landis published Heart of Stone, the first book of the Irish Angels Series in 2010.

Landis and her husband of over forty years, Steve, an actor and slack key guitar player, claim to share their eighty-year-old home in Long Beach, California, with the ghost of writer Upton Sinclair. The childless couple (by choice) also have a home in Hawaii where they now live full-time.

Landis has successfully completed the 6.5 hour kayaking trip around Kauai's Na Pali coastline, and she also enjoys raising orchids, playing the ukulele, quilting and dancing hula.

Over the last few years her back list of award-winning, bestselling historical romances has been re-issued in eBook formats. By the end of 2014 most of her works will be available as eBook downloads.

Bibliography

Flowers Series
 Sun Flower (1988)
 Wild flower (1988)
 Rose (1990)
 Come Spring (1994)

Single novels
 Jade (1991)
 Past Promises (1993)
 Until Tomorrow (1994)
 Glass Beach (1998)
 The Orchid Hunter (2000)
 Summer Moon (2001)
 Magnolia Creek (2002)

Cassidy Family Saga Series
 After All (1995)
 Last Chance (1995)

Louisiana Series
 Day Dreamer (1996)
 Just Once (1997)
 Blue Moon (1999)

Twilight Cove Series
 Lover's Lane (2003)
 Heat Wave (2004)
 Heartbreak Hotel (2005)

Inspirational Romance
 Homecoming (2008)
 The Accidental Lawman (2009)
 Heart of Stone (2010)

The Tiki Goddess Mysteries
 Mai Tai One On (2011)
 Two to Mango (2012)
 Three to Get Lei'd (2013)
 Too Hot Four Hula (2014)

Omnibus
 "Faithful and True" in Loving Hearts (1992)
 "Picture Perfect" in Sweet Hearts (1993) (with Kathleen Kane, Colleen Quinn and Jodi Thomas)
 "Cradle Song" in Three Mothers and a Cradle (1995) (with Debbie Macomber and Gina Ferris Wilkins)
 Heartbreak Ranch (1997) (with Dorsey Kelley, Chelley Kitzmiller and Fern Michaels)
 "Summer Fantasy" in Summer Love (1997) (with Stella Cameron, Anne Stuart and Janelle Taylor) & in Slow Heat (2001) (with Stella Cameron and Lisa Jackson)
 "On Silken Wings" in Strong Currents (2003)

Awards
 1986 - Romance Writers of America Golden Heart Award for Best Unpublished Novel, Sunflower
 1989 - Romance Writers of America Golden Medallion (RITA) Award for Best Published Single-Title Historical Romance, Sunflower
 1987-1988 - Romantic Times Magazine Lifetime Achievement Award for Best New Historical Romance Author
 1989 - Romantic Times Magazine Reviewers' Choice Award for Best Frontier Romance, Wildflower
 1990 - Romance Writers of America RITA Award Finalist for Best Single-Title Historical Romance, Rose
 1991 - Third Place, National Readers' Choice Award, Best Historical Romance, Jade
 1991-1992 Romantic Times Magazine Career Achievement Award for Historical Romance "Love and Laughter"
 1992-1993 Romantic Times Magazine Career Achievement Award Nominee for Western Romance
 1992 - Bookrak Catalogue Bestselling Super Release 1992, Come Spring
 1993 - Romance Writers of America Golden Choice RITA Award for Best Romance of the Year, Come Spring
 1993 - Romance Writers of America RITA Award finalist for Best Single-Title Historical Romance, Come Spring
 1993 - 1994, Romantic Times Magazine Career Reviewers' Choice Award Nominee for Americana Historical Romance, After All
 1994 - Bookrak Catalogue Bestselling Super Release July 1994, Until Tomorrow
 1994 - Second Place, Virginia Romance Writers HOLT Award, Best Novel Southern Theme, Until Tomorrow
 1995 - Publishers Weekly 10 Best Romance Novels of 1995, Last Chance
 1995–1996, Romantic Times Magazine Career Achievement Award Nominee for Americana Historical Romance
 1996 - Romance Readers Anonymous Nominee for Best Historical Single Title Romance, Day Dreamer
 1996 - Second Place, Under the Covers Favorite Historical Romance, Day Dreamer
 1997 - Midwest Fiction Writers Nominee for Best Short Story, "Josie's Story"
 1997 - Romantic Times Magazine Reviewers' Choice Award for Best Historical Romance "Love and Laughter", Just Once
 1998 - Romantic Times Magazine Reviewers' Choice Award Nominee for Best Historical Romance, Glass Beach
 1997-1998 Romantic Times Magazine Career Achievement Award for Historical Romance Nominee
 1999 - Amazon.com 10 Best Historical Romance Novels of 1999, Blue Moon
 1999-2000 - Romantic Times Magazine Career Achievement Award Nominee for Innovative Historical ROmance
 2000 - Romantic Times Magazine Reviewers' Choice Award Nominee for Best Innovative Historical Romance, The Orchid Hunter
 2001 - Romance Writers of America RITA Award Finalist for Best Single-Title Historical Romance, Summer Moon
 2001 - Library Journal Top Five Romance Fiction Novels of 2001, Summer Moon
 2001-2002 - Romantic Times Magazine Career Achievement Award Nominee for American Historical Romance
 2002 - Romance Writers of America RITA Award Finalist for Best Single-Title Historical Romance, Magnolia Creek
 2002 - Romantic Times Magazine Reviewers' Choice Award Nominee for Best Western Romance
 2003 - Romance Writers of America RITA Award Finalist for Best Single-Title Contemporary Romance, Lover's Lane

References

External links
  RBL Romantica Interview with Jill Marie Landis
 A Romance Review Interview with Jill Marie Landis
 Jill Marie Landis Official Website
 Jill Marie Landis in FantasticFiction
 Jill Marie Landis Tiki Mysteries Website

20th-century American novelists
21st-century American novelists
American romantic fiction novelists
RITA Award winners
American women novelists
1948 births
Living people
Women romantic fiction writers
People from Clinton, Indiana
20th-century American women writers
21st-century American women writers